Knoutsodonta inconspicua is a species of sea slug, a dorid nudibranch, a shell-less marine gastropod mollusc in the family Onchidorididae.

Distribution
This species was described from Northumberland, England. It is currently known from the European coasts of the North Atlantic Ocean from Norway south to Brittany.

References

Onchidorididae
Gastropods described in 1851